Bommidoddi is a village in Chittoor district of the Indian state of Andhra Pradesh. It is located in Palamaner mandal.

References

Villages in Chittoor district